Johnny Carroll (born John Lewis Carrell; October 23, 1937January 13, 1995) was an American rockabilly musician.

Biography
Born John Lewis Carrell in Cleburne, Texas, Carrell's last name was printed incorrectly as Carroll in his first recording with Decca Records and he thereafter used that spelling of his name professionally. Carroll began recording for Decca in the middle of the 1950s. He released several singles, none of which saw significant success, though they are now critically acclaimed. His records were eclipsed by the success of other rockabilly and early rock & roll musicians such as Elvis Presley, Jerry Lee Lewis, and Johnny Cash.

His career ended toward the end of the 1950s, but he made a comeback in 1974 with a Gene Vincent tribute song. He continued to record well into the 1980s. For many years he was connected with the Cellar Club in Fort Worth, Texas and other Cellar Clubs around the state.

He died of liver failure on January 13, 1995, and is buried in his hometown of Godley, Texas.

In 1996 a 33-track reissue of his early recordings was released as Rock Baby Rock It: 1955-1960.

Discography 
Early recordings

Later recordings
 "Gene Vincent Rock" (or "The Black Leather Rebel") – 1974
 "Rock, Baby, Rock It" – Sun Records, 1975
 Texabilly – Rollin' Rock, 1977
 First Time All Over Again (with Judy Lindsey) – Gypsy Records, 1980
 "The Telephone Man" (with Judy Lindsey) – Merit Records, 1982
 "Rattle My Bones" – Seville Records, 1983
 Still Satin Sheets (with Judy Lindsey) – Gypsy Records, 1983
 Screamin' Demon Heatwave (feat. Judy Lindsey) – Seville Records, 1983
 Crazy Hot Rock – Charly Records, 1985
 Shades of Vincent (with Judy Lindsey) – Charly Records, 1986

References

American rockabilly musicians
American bandleaders
American male singer-songwriters
American rock guitarists
American country singer-songwriters
American rock singers
American rock songwriters
American rockabilly guitarists
American male guitarists
Singer-songwriters from Texas
People from Cleburne, Texas
Sun Records artists
Phillips International Records artists
Charly Records artists
Decca Records artists
Warner Records artists
Musicians from Dallas
1937 births
1995 deaths
Deaths from kidney failure
20th-century American singers
20th-century American guitarists
Guitarists from Texas
Country musicians from Texas
20th-century American male singers
Johnny Kidd & the Pirates members